The Mighty Quinn can refer to:

"Quinn the Eskimo (Mighty Quinn)", a 1967 song by Bob Dylan, covered by Manfred Mann
The Mighty Quinn (album), the North American title of Manfred Mann's album Mighty Garvey!
The Mighty Quinn (film), a 1989 film starring Denzel Washington
The Mighty Quinn, the 2001 album by rapper San Quinn

See also
"Mighty" John Quinn (wrestler)